Sabbac is the name of three American comic book supervillains appearing in DC Comics. The original Sabbac debuted in Captain Marvel Jr. #4 (February 1943), and was created by Otto Binder and Al Carreno as an enemy of Captain Marvel Jr., while an updated version debuted in Outsiders #8 (March 2004), and was created by Judd Winick and Tom Raney as a nemesis for both Junior and the Outsiders superhero team. A third version was introduced in Justice League #10 (August 2012), and was created by Geoff Johns and Gary Frank as an adversary for the Shazam Family and an associate of Black Adam and the Seven Deadly Sins of Man.

Ishmael Gregor appeared in the television series Arrow, portrayed by David Meunier, and the DC Extended Universe film Black Adam, portrayed by Marwan Kenzari.

Fictional character biographies

Timothy Karnes

The original Sabbac is depicted as a "dark opposite" to the Marvels, similar to Captain Marvel's foe Ibac, who draws his powers from four historical villains. The dark forces of Hell gave the human Timothy Karnes (alternatively spelled as Barnes) the power to become a being with powers to rival Captain Marvel. To access this power, all Karnes has to do is say the magic word Sabbac, and magic black lightning strikes up from the underworld and transforms him into a muscle-bound demon with super-strength, super-speed, flight, fire breath, and the ability to emit fire blasts from the palms of his hands. His powers match those of the Marvels. Like Captain Marvel's magic word Shazam, the word Sabbac is an acronym for the six beings who empower Sabbac: the demons Satan, Aym, Belial, Beelzebub, Asmodeus and Crateis. He resembles Timothy in green robes but with a more muscular build and fangs in his pronounced overbite. Sabbac was an enemy of Captain Marvel Jr. Sabbac appeared in two issues of the Golden Age Captain Marvel Jr. comic book (issues #4 and #6, both from 1943), and in two issues each of World's Finest Comics and Adventure Comics during the early 1980s. When he first appears he joins Nazi agents, being promised power over America if he helps them conquer it, and tries to destroy transport lines to isolate eastern and western North America. However, as he continues to battle Jr., the various demons empowering him leave him as things grow increasingly bleak for the villain, removing his powers until Satan leaves him, allowing him to be defeated.

In 2004, Sabbac was introduced into DC Comics continuity in Outsiders #8, written by Judd Winick and illustrated by Tom Raney. The story established Timothy Karnes as Freddy Freeman's (Captain Marvel Jr.'s alter-ego) former foster brother. Freddy's parents, David and Rebecca Freeman, had taken Timothy in, but the boy was sent to live with another family when the couple were killed in a car accident. Timothy would find himself shuffled from one abusive foster home to another, and grew to hate and resent Freddy Freeman, who lived a successful and relatively peaceful life with his grandfather.

Sabbac's origin was depicted in the 2005/2006 Superman/Shazam! First Thunder miniseries, written by Winick and drawn by Joshua Middleton. Dr. Sivana, hoping to find a way to kill Captain Marvel, has the high priest of the Temple of Bagdan kidnap Timothy, whom they learn is a descendant of the Bagdan line and the heir to the demonic powers of Sabbac. During a demonic ritual, Timothy is transformed for the first time into the demon Sabbac and challenges Superman and Captain Marvel. Marvel defeats Sabbac after tricking him into saying his name (and thus causing him to turn back into Timothy).

Ishmael Gregor
In Outsiders #8-10, Captain Marvel Jr. and the Outsiders team face a new, more feral version of Sabbac. This version of Sabbac, possessing amplified demonic powers and a hairy beast-like appearance with horns instead of the more humanoid original form, is the alter ego of Ishmael Gregor, a Russian immigrant who had become a New York City mob boss. Gregor lusted after the power of Sabbac and had his men find Timothy Karnes, who had been incarcerated and had his voice box removed to prevent him from speaking. Gregor initiates a demonic ritual which he states will allow Karnes to access his power without needing to speak. The ritual involves the murder of an entire New York bus full of passengers. At the end, Gregor kills Karnes and gains the power of Sabbac for himself.

The second Sabbac opens a portal in the backyard of a very specific California home. This brings a host of demons into the world. He is challenged by the Outsiders and Captain Marvel Jr. and flees when his demons are defeated.

The Secret Society of Super-Villains sends Deathstroke the Terminator to Las Vegas, where Sabbac is taking over the local Mafia. Deathstroke kills Sabbac's personal entourage and convinces him that the Society has much to offer.

Sabbac also works with the Fearsome Five to attack Alcatraz in San Francisco, now a supervillain prison. They are there for the seemingly minor purpose of freeing the FF member Mammoth. During the attack, the magical Rock of Eternity explodes over Gotham City. Sabbac's preparations allow him to absorb the sentient power of the Seven Deadly Enemies of Man. He also grows much larger. He uses 'Lust' to bring down the Five, the Alcatraz prisoners, and a majority of the guards. He uses the other sins in combat against the Outsiders. Donna Troy appears and the heroes use Katana's magic Soultaker sword to imprison the demon. From inside the Soultaker, Sabbac admits that the Society had enlisted him to kidnap Captain Marvel Jr. and bring him to Lex Luthor.

One Year Later
When the Outsiders were out of options, Katana summoned forth Ishmael from the Soultaker to destroy Dr. Sivana's base.

52
In the 52 maxiseries, Captain Marvel, on the brink of insanity due to the Sins' voices, mentioned that Sabbac had tried an assault on the Rock of Eternity. Later in the series, Sabbac attacked Boston on Halloween, with the intention of kidnapping children and sacrificing their souls to the demon-lord Neron, causing a new age of blood. Sabbac was now several stories tall, and was only stopped through the efforts of both the Marvel Family and the Black Marvel Family, who strike him with their lightning and knock him out. The Black Marvels then move him to an unknown location, and their popularity was increased.

Mr. Bryer
After DC's 2011 The New 52, a new version of Sabbac was introduced. This version of Sabbac was a physical manifestation of the Seven Deadly Sins of Man, who can simultaneously possess a wicked person (in this case, Mr. Bryer, a rich man who bullies Billy Batson along with his sons) and transform that person into a 50-foot demon that breathes fire. Sabbac then attacked downtown Philadelphia under the command of Black Adam, who was intent on having the demon destroy the world so Adam could remake it in his own image. The Shazam Family united to save the city from Sabbac as Shazam himself took on Black Adam. Bryer is then sent to the hospital after Sabbac leaves his body.

Powers and abilities
All versions of Sabbac have immense strength, stamina, durability, speed, agility, reflexes, healing, and wisdom, as well as hypersonic flight. Both Barnes and Gregor are able to project fire from their mouths or hands. This is accomplished by saying Sabbac, which would undo the change. The Bryer version of Sabbac can possess human bodies, potentially live forever, and take on any appearance at will or cast illusions that makes him look like another person.

In other media
 Ishmael Gregor appears in flashbacks depicted in the fifth season of Arrow, portrayed by David Meunier. This version is the human Pakhan, or boss, of the Solntsevskaya branch of the Bratva who secretly works for Konstantin Kovar. After Oliver Queen reveals Gregor's true allegiance and causes a civil war within the Bratva's ranks, Gregor is killed and replaced by Anatoly Knyazev.
 The Ishmael Gregor incarnation of Sabbac appears in Black Adam, portrayed by Marwan Kenzari. This version is the leader of Intergang's Kahndaq branch and a descendant of the Kahndaq tyrant King Ak-Thon (also portrayed by Kenzari) who seeks out the Crown of Sabbac, which his ancestor failed to claim due to  Adam|Teth-Adam. After being killed by Teth-Adam in the present, Gregor's spirit reaches the Rock of Finality, where he is empowered by Satan, Aym, Belial, Beelzebub, Asmodeus, and Crateris to serve as their champion. Nevertheless, Teth-Adam kills Gregor once more with the Justice Society of America's help.

References

External links
 Sabbac at Comic Vine

Characters created by Otto Binder
Characters created by Judd Winick
Comics characters introduced in 1943
Comics characters introduced in 2004
Comics characters introduced in 2013
DC Comics characters who can move at superhuman speeds
DC Comics characters who use magic
DC Comics characters with accelerated healing
DC Comics characters with superhuman strength
DC Comics demons
DC Comics supervillains
DC Extended Universe characters
Fawcett Comics supervillains
Fictional characters granted magic or power through dealings
Fictional characters who can change size
Fictional characters with fire or heat abilities
Fictional characters with immortality
Fictional characters with spirit possession or body swapping abilities
Fictional characters with superhuman durability or invulnerability
Fictional gangsters
Fictional giants
Fictional half-demons
Fictional illusionists
Golden Age supervillains
Captain Marvel (DC Comics)